Kolors is the sixth and final solo album by British blues rock musician Peter Green, who was the founder of Fleetwood Mac and a member from 1967–70. Released in 1983, the album consisted largely of songs from previous recording sessions that had not been included on his past albums.

Peter Green's songwriting credits were under his original name of Peter Greenbaum. Many of the tracks were composed by Peter's brother, Mike Green.

Track listing
"What Am I Doing Here?" (Mike Green) – 3:30
"Bad Bad Feeling" (M. Green) – 3:38
"Big Boy Now" (M. Green) – 5:55
"Black Woman" (M. Green) – 3:59
"Bandit" (Peter Greenbaum, M. Green) – 3:05
"Same Old Blues" (Traditional) – 3:45
"Liquor and You" (M. Green) – 3:49
"Gotta Do It with Me" (M. Green) – 4:02
"Funky Jam" (P. Greenbaum) – 8:14

Tracks 1, 4 & 5 are outtakes from Little Dreamer
Track 5 can be found in its original form on the album Legend
Tracks 2, 6–8 are outtakes from Whatcha Gonna Do?
Tracks 3 & 9 are outtakes from White Sky

Track listing (remastered & expanded version)
"Black Woman" (M. Green)
"Bandit" (P. Greenbaum, M. Green)
"What Am I Doing Here?" (M. Green)
"Bad Bad Feeling" (M. Green)
"Same Old Blues" (Traditional)
"Liquor and You" (M. Green)
"Gotta Do It with Me" (M. Green)
"Big Boy Now" (M. Green)
"Funky Jam" (P. Greenbaum)
"Apostle" (single version)   (P. Greenbaum)
"Whatcha Gonna Do?" (M. Green)
"Rubbing My Eyes" (M. Green)
"Long Way from Home" (M. Green)
"Six String Guitar" (M. Green)
"You Won't See Me Anymore" (M. Green)

Track 10 is an outtake from In the Skies
Tracks 1–3 & 12 are outtakes from Little Dreamer
Track 2 can be found in its original form on the album Legend
Tracks 4–7, 11, 13–15 are outtakes from Whatcha Gonna Do?
Tracks 8 & 9 are outtakes from White Sky

Personnel
Peter Green – guitar, vocals
Mike Green – vocals
Bob Bowman – guitar
Ronnie Johnson – guitar
Larry Steele – bass guitar
Paul Westwood – bass guitar
Mo Foster – bass guitar
Daniel Boone – keyboards, backing vocals
Webster Johnson – keyboards
Roy Shipston – keyboards
Reg Isidore – drums
Dave Mattacks – drums
Jeff Whittaker – percussion
Trevor Orton – pan pipes
Lesley Boone – backing vocals

Technical
Ron Lee – producer
Dave Lester – engineer

References

Peter Green (musician) albums
1983 compilation albums